Bebel Gilberto is an album by Brazilian bossa nova singer Bebel Gilberto.

Track listing
 "Baby" - 3:49
 "Simplesmente" - 4:49
 "Aganjú" - 4:44
 "All Around" - 4:44
 "River Song" - 4:57
 "Every Day You've Been Away" - 4:05
 "Cada Beijo" - 4:26
 "O Caminho" - 2:59
 "Winter" - 4:19
 "Céu Distante" - 2:58
 "Jabuticaba" - 3:02
 "Next to You" - 2:54

Weekly charts

As of 2005 it has sold 101,000 copies in United States according to Nielsen SoundScan. In 2011 it was awarded a gold certification from the Independent Music Companies Association which indicated sales of at least 75,000 copies throughout Europe.

References

Bebel Gilberto albums
2004 albums
Crammed Discs albums